Chola invasion of Kalinga may refer to:
Chola invasion of Kalinga (1097)
Chola invasion of Kalinga (1110)